Hebron is an unincorporated community in Pleasants County, West Virginia, United States, along McKim Creek.

The community most likely was named after the ancient city of Hebron.

References

Unincorporated communities in Pleasants County, West Virginia
Unincorporated communities in West Virginia